Tanko may refer to the following people: 

Tanko Braimah (born 1979), Ghanaian sprinter 
Tanko Dyakov (born 1984), Bulgarian football defender 
Tanko Serafimov (1942–2013), Bulgarian architect
Tanko Yakasai (born 1926), Nigerian politician and human right activist 
Tanko Zubairu, Nigerian military administrator 

Surname
Abubakar Tanko Ayuba, Nigerian politician 
Ibrahim Tanko (born 1977), Ghanaian football forward
Ibrahim Tanko Muhammad (born 1953), Nigerian jurist 
Maksim Tanko (born 1994), Belarusian football player
Mark Tanko (born 1996), Nigerian football player
Mohammed Tanko (born 1988), Ghanaian football player
Umaru Tanko Al-Makura (born 1952), Nigerian businessman and politician

See also

Tonko